Metrobus may refer to:

Transport services

Bus Rapid Transit
MetroBus (Bristol), a bus rapid transit system in Bristol, England, United Kingdom
Metrobus (Buenos Aires), a bus rapid transit system in Buenos Aires, Argentina
Metrobus (Istanbul), a public transit system in Istanbul, Turkey
Metrobus (Lahore), a public rapid transit system in Lahore, Pakistan
Métrobus (Quebec), bus rapid transit service operated by the Réseau de transport de la Capitale in Quebec City, Canada
Metrobus (South East England), a public transport bus service operating in the South East of England, United Kingdom
Metrobus (Tegucigalpa), a bus system under construction in Tegucigalpa, Honduras
Mexico City Metrobús, a bus rapid transit system in Mexico City, Mexico
Multan Metrobus, a public rapid transit system in Multan, Pakistan
Rawalpindi-Islamabad Metrobus, a public rapid transit system in Rawalpindi-Islamabad, Pakistan
Los Angeles Metro Busway, a bus rapid transit system in Los Angeles, United States
Metronit, a bus rapid transit system in Haifa, Israel
Transmilenio, a bus rapid transit system in Bogotá, Colombia

Conventional
Metrobus (Miami), the bus network of Miami-Dade Transit in Miami, Florida, United States
Metrobus (Montreal), express feeder routes to the Montreal métro in Montréal, Québec, Canada
MetroBus (St. Louis), the bus system operated by the Bi-State Development Agency in St Louis, Missouri, United States
Metrobus (Sydney), a high frequency bus network in Sydney, Australia
Metrobus (Washington, D.C.), a bus service in Washington DC, United States, and immediate suburbs in Maryland and Virginia
Metrobus Transit, a public transit system in St John's, Newfoundland, Canada
Capital MetroBus, a public transit bus network in Austin, Texas, United States
El Metropolitano, a public transit system in Lima, Perú
Havana MetroBus, the principal bus network of Havana, Cuba
Metro Tasmania a public bus service in Tasmania, Australia
Metropolitan Transit Authority of Harris County, bus service in the Houston, Texas, United States

Ticket 
 Metrobús (ticket), the Madrid Metro and Bus ticket.

Organisations
King County Metro, the public transit authority of King County, Washington, United States
Metro Bus Corporation, a Seoul bus operator
Metrobus (London) a bus operator in London, England, operated by London General
Metrobus (Malaysia), a bus operator in the Klang Valley
Metrobus (South East England) a bus operator in Surrey, Sussex and Kent in South East England
MetroBus, trading name of the Metropolitan (Perth) Passenger Transport Trust from 1995 until 2003
M-é-t-r-o-b-u-s, a bus and metro operator Tramway de Rouen in Rouen, France
West Yorkshire Metro, passenger transport executive in West Yorkshire, England

Other
MAN Metrobus (de), a bus model manufactured by MAN and Krauss-Maffei (1959-1973), and under license as Ikarus MAN IK-5 by Ikarus Zemun (1972-1981), and Roman 112U by Autobuzul Bucharest (1974-1980)
MCW Metrobus, a bus model manufactured by Metro Cammell Weymann in the 1970s and 1980s

See also
Metro (disambiguation)